In enzymology, an abequosyltransferase is an enzyme that catalyzes the chemical reaction

CDP-abequose + D-mannosyl-L-rhamnosyl-D-galactose-1-diphospholipid  CDP + D-abequosyl-D-mannosyl-rhamnosyl-D-galactose-1-diphospholipid

Thus, the two substrates of this enzyme are CDP-abequose and D-mannosyl-L-rhamnosyl-D-galactose-1-diphospholipid, whereas its two products are CDP and D-abequosyl-D-mannosyl-rhamnosyl-D-galactose-1-diphospholipid.

This enzyme belongs to the family of glycosyltransferases, specifically the hexosyltransferases.  The systematic name of this enzyme class is CDP-abequose:D-mannosyl-L-rhamnosyl-D-galactose-1-diphospholipid D-abequosyltransferase. This enzyme is also called trihexose diphospholipid abequosyltransferase.

References

 

EC 2.4.1
Enzymes of unknown structure